Abberton is an English surname derived from a toponymic. Notable people with the surname include:

 Dakota Abberton, Australian surfer
 Jai Abberton (born ), Australian surfer
 Koby Abberton (born 1979), Australian surfer
 Sunny Abberton (born ), Australian surfer

References 

English toponymic surnames